Fathabad (also Romanized as Fatḩābād) is a village in Qolqol Rud Rural District, Qolqol Rud District, Tuyserkan County, Hamadan Province, Iran. At the 2006 census, its population was 191, in 43 families.

References 

Populated places in Tuyserkan County